The Soda Water Cowboy is a 1927 American silent Western film. Directed by Richard Thorpe, the film stars Hal Taliaferro, Beryl Roberts, and J. P. Lockney. It was released on September 25, 1927.

Cast list
 Hal Taliaferro as Wally (credited as Wally Wales)
 Beryl Roberts as Mademoiselle Zalla
 J. P. Lockney as Professor Beerbum
 Slim Whitaker as Ross (credited as Charles Whitaker)
 Al Taylor as Joe

References

1927 films
1927 Western (genre) films
American black-and-white films
Pathé Exchange films
Films directed by Richard Thorpe
Silent American Western (genre) films
1920s English-language films
1920s American films